Opera Multi Steel, often abbreviated as OMS, is a French minimal synth and coldwave band,  originally founded in Bourges in 1983 by Franck Lopez, Patrick L. Robin and Catherine Marie.

The band is now based in Savigny-en-Septaine. Opera Multi Steel is known for its incorporation of medieval and renaissance elements in electronic music, lyrics and album artworks.

History

1982–1990  

Opera Multi Steel was founded during the winter 1982-83 in Bourges, France. The original members were Franck Lopez, his brother Patrick L. Robin and Catherine Marie. A four-track EP recorded in 1984 was the first studio recording from the band. The following year, OMS released Cathédrale, a 10-track album dedicated to this gothic building of Bourges. The band gave many concerts and played in several French festivals. It also contributed to many K7 and vinyl compilations on French and European independent labels.

Opera Multi Steel recorded several songs on K7s with lighter sound material.  Many of these tracks were never released, or were available as limited editions. Some of them have been rerecorded and rearranged to be included on some official studio albums released later.

Xavier Martin, an electric guitar player, joined the band in 1987 for the studio sessions of Personne ne Dort, a 2-track 45 RPM with a cover designed by the French painter Speedy Graphito. Xavier Martin left the group after one year to pursue his interest in rock music as a drummer.

In 1988, Eric Milhiet, who had played with Franck in other bands before, joined Opera Multi Steel  for the recording sessions of the 8-track album A Contresens.

1990–2000 

Les Douleurs de l’Ennui, an 11-track album, was released in 1990. The cover shows a painted photograph  representing a female medieval knight, made up by Pierre et Gilles, designers from Paris.

Jean-Marc Bougain first appeared as digital percussionist on this record, and joined the band for stage performances as well.

The band's 17-track album Stella Obscura took the whole 1991 to be recorded and was released the year after. Patrick L.Robin, the band's lead singer, suffering from schizophrenia, was hospitalized for some time shortly after its release, because of several suicide attempts.  Then  the band stopped his activities.

In 1995, the Brazilian independent label Museum Obscuro, division of Cri du Chat Disques, released an OMS compilation called Days of Creation, presenting a selection of songsfrom the ten first years of the band. Some of those recordings had become popular at São Paulo gothic dance clubs. In 1997 the label then issued a brand new 14-track album called Histoires de France, which included lyrics that Robin wrote during his convalescence.  Later that year, Franck, Catherine and Eric, with support from Carine Grieg (Collection d’Arnell Andréa), came to Brazil for  two concerts, playing musics from their recent and new albums.

In 1998, the band recorded 11 tracks for a new album, titled Eternelle Tourmente, at "Studio du Rempart de la Miséricorde" in Dijon, France. Four of these tracks were new versions of very old songs from limited edition K7 tapes, and seven were new compositions. Most lyrics were written by Patrick L.Robin, but Pauvre Sens et pauvre mémoire was composed on a text by the medieval French poet Rutebeuf and Tristesse on lyrics by the French realistic poetress Marie Mareau. The artwork shows Wounded Angel (1903), a picture by the Finnish painter Hugo Simberg. The album includes folk, medieval music, synthpop, darkwave and coldwave music, and includes vocals by Carine Grieg. Eternelle Tourmente was released by the German label Triton in May 1999.

In August 2000, the CD re-edition of the whole OMS previous discography was completed with A Contresens.

2000–2010 

In 2001, the musicians began to work on a new album, Une Idylle en Péril,  released in 2003 byTriton. On some of the songs may be noticed additional performances  by Carine Grieg (vocals) and  Thibault d'Abboville (viola), both CdAA members. The album  contains folk music with mandolas, guitars, flutes, mixed with samples from Medieval and Renaissance classic composers. The artwork, an angel helping two young people to cross railtracks, was created by Reno. In 2005 and 2006, several songs, including Un Froid seul and Du son des Cloches were included on French CD and DVD compilations.

OMS stopped recording albums in 2002. During this pause, they involved themselves in another project called "O Quam Tristis..." After an eight-year break, and after the release of a double compilation Parachèvement de l'Esquisse (2008) on the Brazilian label Wave Records, the group returns in 2010 with a new album entitled La Légende dorée produced by  Wave Records.The album's title was inspired by a book written by Jacques de Voragine between 1261 and 1266. The same year, Opera Multi Steel contributed to the compilation "30 Years with(out) Ian Curtis" initiated by the French label Infrastition. For this posthumous tribute to Joy Division, the group performed a cover of the title "Isolation", translated into French for this special occasion.

Meanwhile, some of their material was re-issued on various formats. In September 2007,  Infrastition released the second CD re-edition of the 1985 Cathédrale, including the four tracks of the first EP of the band, and some period videos. In 2008, the OMS track Là où l’Homme trépasse, from the album Eternelle Tourmente, was included on the compilation Ruines et Vanités, released by the French Magazine "Trinity" to celebrate its 10th birthday.

In September 2008, the German label Vinyl-on-Demand issued a three LP Box set called OMS K7 Tapes Archives MCMLXXXIII-MCMLXXXVI, an anthology of 36 tracks from 1980s OMS K7 tapes, including some unreleased demos.

The song lls s’eloignent was included in the 2010 compilation album Cold Waves and Minimal Electronics Vol.1.

2010–Present 
After concerts in Brazil in April 2011, the group performed again in Europe, at the Wave Gotik Treffen in Leipzig in May 2012. Finally, Opéra Multi Steel, which had not given any concert in Bourges, his hometown, for over twenty- five years, performed at the Théâtre de Verdure in the Jardin des Prés-Fichaux on July 26, 2012 for a show entitled Éternelle Tourmente in tribute to the bas-relief by the French sculptor Vital Coulhon (1871-1914), which adorns one of the basins of the park.

In 2013  the album Mélancolie en prose is released  . It is composed with one  half of new titles and the other half with new versions of songs that were originally released on very limites edition K7 tapes in the early days of the group. A clip on the title Mauvais Œil directed by Alan Cassiano, a Brazilian artist, based on images by the French painter Étienne Azambre accompanies this release. In its limited collector's edition, this new album comes with a translucent LP titled Cathedral MMXIII, featuring three completely redesigned standards of the band, including two versions of Cathedral (one in French, the other in Portuguese), as well as Forme et Reforme and Jardin botanique

Apparences de l'Invisible, the band's tenth album, is released as vinyl in April 2014. This is the first studio album since Les Douleurs de l'Ennui  to be released on this format. It is produced by the French label Meidosem Records and includes eight new titles. Dotted with quotes to the sacred vocal music and situationist sounds, its atmospheres revisit different eras and inclinations of the band : cold wave (Presqu'Imparfait du Suggestif), Folk (Circonstancielle Défiance) or pop (Ad nauseam, Infini sidéral ...)

In 2015, Opéra Multi Steel pays tribute to the French singer Étienne Daho on the Pistes Noires compilation issued on the Boredom Product French label. The band takes up in its own style the song Bleu comme toi. Once again solicited by Boredom Product, the band takes over Martin Dupont's Inside Out on the Broken Memory compilation, a tribute to this French cult band from the eighties.

Réminiscences, released at the end of 2017, is a collection of eight Opera Multi Steel "standards"  taken from various albums and revisited by the members of the band in a more punchy perspective than the original versions. You can hear Cathedrale, Du son des Cloches , Les Sens, Fureur en Asie ... The clip directed by Alan Cassiano on the title Les Sens is a retrospective of the various sleeves and booklets of Opera Multi Steel recordings since their very first 4-track EP published in 1984. The Perspectives by

Jan Vredeman de Vries which had been used on this first opus are particularly in the spotlight in this video which uses them as a main backdrop.

Side-projects 
Between 1994 and 1997, Patrick L. Robin performed as singer in the electro-indus project Afghanistan created by Philippe Chasset (Bela Luna). The duet recorded as limited editions twoK7's  : Autodafé, Vox Europa and two cds : Gods and Prothesis, Sects and Sex.

From 2000 to 2008, the Opera Multi Steel members, with the help of Carine Grieg (Collection d'Arnell-Andréa, Anna's Tree), gathered themselves under pseudonyms on another project : "O Quam Tristis ...", an electro-medieval-heavenly formation. Four albums were recorded : Funérailles des Petits Enfants (2000), Le Rituel sacré (2002), Méditations Ultimes (2005), Les Chants funestes (2008) both released on Palace of Worms, an Italian label.

In 2001 Franck Lopez, under the pseudonym  of Hugues Dammarie lent his voice and played flutes on the second album (Never again will I dream...) of  the Dark ambient project Bleeding Like Mine created by Curt Emmer based in Milwaukee.

Franck Lopez and Eric Milhiet (OMS), under the pseudonyms of Hugues Dammarie and Emeric Lenotz worked as a duet for  Palace of Worms. This project called Thy Violent Vanities recorded a unique album entitled Come to Dust (2004) with extra performances by Liesbeth Houdijk (voices) and Pierre-Yves Lebeau (guitars and voices) from the Dutch-French group Hide and Seek.

Since 1991, under the pseudonym of Franz Torres-Quevedo, Franck Lopez performs as a bassist-guitarist-vocalist in the French coldwave ensemble Collection d'Arnell-Andréa. He took part to the recording of eight studio  albums : Les Marronniers (1992), Villers-aux -Vents (1994), Cirse des champs (1996), Tristesse des Mânes (2002), The Bower of Despair (2004), Exposition (2007), Live à la Nuit des Fées (2008) and Vernes-Monde (2010).

Franck Lopez is also the lead singer of the French-Brazilian electro-pop band 3 Cold Men together with Alex Twin and Maurizio Bonito. The trio has recorded three studio albums : The Three Cold Men (2004), Photogramm (2008), A Cold Decade (2012) and a remix CD Urban RMXS (2005).

In 2007, after many years, Franck met again Lionel Baillemont, one  of the founding members of his very first folk band Avaric, for a project called The Crimson Trinity. This band recorded two eponymous albums in 2007 and 2012.

On the same year Franck performed as singer/guitarist on two songs (Memorial, Love and Faith) of the album Roses, Sorrow and Red candies from the German band Bastards of Love, a Tobi Margaux project.

In 2010, for the 30th anniversary of the founding of Avaric, Lionel Baillemont and Franck Lopez re-recorded and rearranged a selection of fifteen titles selected among the band's four albums released at the time. This compilation, simply titled Avaric, came out as a 60-page cd book illustrated with numerous period photographs, interviews and various archives.

Together with Catherine Marie (OMS), Franck Lopez met again Liesbeth Houdijk and Pierre-Yves Lebeau (Hide and Seek) for a new project called Tiramist. The quartet gave birth to a debut album entitled For Your Ears Only, sophisticated pop on surrealistic lyrics,  released in 2016 on Wave Records.

With Curt Emmer (Bleeding Like Mine), Franck released in 2017 a 15-track album under the name of Seven Sobs of a Sorrowful Soul. The musical orientation is dark folk ambient based on repetitive sequences of piano / synth / rhythms. The melodies support texts by English authors from the 16th and 17th centuries.

Also in 2017, Franck Lopez performed as bass player on the two titles of a single from the German-Brazilian band Wintry created by Alex Twin (3 Cold Men, Pecadores...) and the singer Anne Goldacker (ex Obsyre). This single, released by Wave Records and titled Ausweg, is produced by John Fryer.

Band members

Current members 

 Franck Lopez : lead and backing vocals, keyboards, guitars, bass, recorders, percussions, (1983–present)
 Patrick L. Robin : lead and backing vocals (main), keyboards, recorders, percussions (1983–present)
 Catherine Marie : Keyboards, rhythm programming, backing vocals, voices (1983–present)
 Eric Milhiet : keyboards, bass, guitars, flute (1988–present)

Former members 

 Xavier Martin – electric guitar (1987-1988)
 Jean-Marc Bougain – drums and percussions (1990-1992)

Recordings

Studio albums 

Cathédrale (1985) LP - Orcadia Machina   
A Contresens (1988) LP - Orcadia Machina
Les Douleurs de L'Ennui (1990) LP - Orcadia Machina
Stella Obscura (1992) CD - Orcadia Machina
Histoires de France (1996) CD - Museum Obscuro 
Eternelle Tourmente (1999) CD -Triton
Une Idylle en péril (2003) CD - Triton
La Légende dorée  (2010) CD - Wave Records
Mélancolie en prose (2013) CD - Wave Records
Apparences de l'Invisible (2014) LP - Meidosem Records
Au Fief des Rémanences (2018) LP - Meidosem Records
Apparences de l'Invisible + Au Fief des Rémanences (2018) Double CD Meidosem Records

K7s 

Autres Appels (1985) Orcadia Machina
Eternelle Tourmente (1986) Orcadia Machina
Opera Multi Steel & Modern Art (1987) Split tape - Orcadia Machina 
Je regarde la pluie (1987) Orcadia Machina 
Regret qui s'écaille (1987) Orcadia Machina
OMS in concert (1987) Orcadia Machina

EPs and singles 

Eponymous (1984) 4-track Ep - Orcadia Machina
Personne ne dort (1987) 2-track 45 rpm - Orcadia Machina
Les Martyrs (1991) 4 track-Mini cd Premonition
Cathédrale MMXIII (2013) 4-track Ep - Wave Records

Compilations 

O.M.S. / Compilation (1987) K7 IRRE Tapes
Opera Multi Steel January 1989 (1989) K7- Rain Tapes
Figures de style (1989) K7- EEtapes
Jardin botanique (1989) K7- NG Medien
Days of Creation (1995) CD Museum Obscuro
Parachèvement de l´Esquisse (2008) 2 CDs - Wave Records
K7 Tapes Archives MCMLXXXIII-MCMLXXXVII (2008) 3 LPs -Vinyl on Demand
Réminiscences (2017) Compilations of 8 revisited tracks - LP Picture disc - Wave Records
Réminiscences " (2018) 8 + 7 revisited tracks - CD - Wave Records

 Reeditions 
 Cathédrale  (1997) Album + Eponymous EP - reedition as CD (Orcadia Machina / Lullaby Records)
 Les Douleurs de l'ennui (1998) reedition as CD (Orcadia Machina / Lullaby Records)
 Cathédrale (2007) Album + Eponymous EP + Period videos - 2nd reedition as CD (Infrastition)
 Histoires de France (2011) Reedition 2CDs - Album + original demos (Infrastition)
 Opéra Multi Steel eponymous Ep (2014) reedition as vinyl (Dark Entries Records)

 Contributions to compilations 
 International Sound Communication - Vol 7 (1985) Man's Hate Production K7
 Felix qui rerum cognoscere causas - Belial Tapes K7
 Opere senza ombre - Dopo N°12 - Megamagomusic K7
 Dejad que los ninos (1986) 3EM Producciones K7
 To Post a Tape - Vol 2 (1986) Fraction Studio K7
 Grenouille (1987) Organic K7
 Andreas N°5- Not apartheid (1987) Fraction Studio K7
 Passions organiques - Vol 4 "Songs" (1987) A.P.E.A.C K7
 En travers de la gorge (1987) Psychodélires K7
 The Unknown Two Rain Tapes K7
 The Unknown Three (1986) Rain Tapes K7
 No Pop? Ooch Pop ! Vol 1 - Hund Fass K7
 Rythmetic (1986) Fusion D.E Producciones K7
 Stigmata Tapes N°1 (1986) Stigmata Tapes K7
 Dépendance binaire - Garde au sol production K7
 Insane Music for Insane People - Vol 9 (1986) Insane Music K7
 Life, the Underground and Everything - Music and Elsewhere K7
 The Unknown Four (1987) Rain Tapes K7
 Orcades Machinales Vol 1 et 2 (1988) Orcadia Machina K7
 The Unknown Six (1988) Rain Tapes K7
 Nimramicha (1988) Aruru K7
 Orcades machinales - Vol 3 & 4 (1989) Orcadia     Machina K7
 Night and Day dreams (1989) IRRE Tapes K7
 Color Pop Explosion (1989) Color Disc K7
 The Unknown Seven (1989) Rain Tapes K7
 And the Trees Are Waiting / Und die baüme die warten (1990) NG Medien K7
 Icare (1990) Orcadia Machina K7
 Mail Compilation Project (1990) Hahamandad K7
 Neue Muster - Vol.7 (1990) Tonspur Tapes K7
 Individual Pop (1990) Claus Korn K7
 The Great "We Love the Beetles" Swindle (1991) K7
 Quatrième communion (1992) Orcadia Machina K7
 Beaucoup (1992) V.I.S.A CD
 Isis (1993) Les Ateliers du son K7
 Neue Muster - Vol.10 (1993) Tonspur Tapes K7
 Black Sundays - Vol 1 (1993) GP Records LP
 Isis (1993) K7
 Secreto Metro (1993) A Contresens K7
 Andreas N°9 (1994) Fraction Studio K7
 Fraction Studio Promo N°1- (1995) Fraction Studio K7
 Instants ardents (1996) Les Variations ludiques CD
 Black Sundays - Vol. 2 (1997) CD
 Taste This 7 (1997) Discordia CD
 Instants sacrés / Instants damnés (1999) Euterpe Production CD
 Storm the Palace : Worms A.D . MCXVII (1999) Palace of Worms Records CD
 Triton Compilation II (2000) Triton CD
 The Power of a New Aeon (2000) Palace of Worms Records  CD
 Triton Compilation III (2002) Triton CD
 Transmission 81-89 The French Cold Wave (2005)  Infrastition CD
 RVB~Transfert (2006) Optical Sound CD
 Movement One - Vol 1 (2006) Str8line Records CD
 15 (2006) Infrastition CD
 Wave Klassix - Vol 1 (2007) Wave Records CD
 Ruines & Vanités (2008) Trinity CD
 Cold Wave and Minimal Electronics - Vol 1 (2009) Angular Recording Corporation CD LP
 Wave Records Sampler(2009) Wave Records CD
 30 Years With(out) Ian Curtis (2010) Infrastition CD
 Beyond the Frontiers (2011) S.A.D.E CD
 Dark Summer-Die highlights von Wave Gotik Treffen (2012) Zillo DVD
 80's Compilation EP French Side (2013) EE Tapes EP
 Gothic Visions - Vol 5 (2014) Orkus DVD
 Pistes noires (2015) Boredom product CD
 Broken Memory'' (2017) Boredom product K7

References

External links
http://opera.multi.steel.pagesperso-orange.fr/About%20us.htm

Cold wave groups
Musical groups established in 1983
1983 establishments in France